Vijayrao Bhaskarrao Auti is a leader of Shivsena. He has served office as a Deputy Speaker of Maharashtra Legislative Assembly in the year 2018–2019. He had been elected for three consecutive terms in the Maharashtra Legislative Assembly for 2004, 2009 and 2014.
Vijay Auti is the son of Bhaskarrao Auti, freedom fighter and ex-MLA from Parner. Ravi Gaikwad, Chief of RTO Thane (Konkan range), Chief of road safety cell, Government of Maharashtra, is his nephew, son of his elder sister Pushpa Gaikwad.

Positions held
 2004: Elected to Maharashtra Legislative Assembly (1st term)
 2009: Re-Elected to Maharashtra Legislative Assembly (2nd term)
 2014: Re-Elected to Maharashtra Legislative Assembly (3rd term)
 2015: Upvidhan (उपविधान) Samiti Pramukh Maharashtra Vidhan Mandal
 2018: Elected as Deputy Speaker of Maharashtra Legislative Assembly

See also
 Ahmednagar Lok Sabha constituency

References

External links
 Shivsena Home Page
 http://www.mahanews.gov.in/Home/MantralayNewsDetails.aspx?str=M5gVQTCIWfI=
 http://www.business-standard.com/article/politics/shiv-sena-to-join-bjp-govt-in-maharashtra-as-political-drama-ends-114120400515_1.html

Living people
People from Ahmednagar district
Maharashtra MLAs 2004–2009
Maharashtra MLAs 2009–2014
Maharashtra MLAs 2014–2019
Shiv Sena politicians
Marathi politicians
Year of birth missing (living people)
Deputy Speakers of the Maharashtra Legislative Assembly